Punika Kulsoontornrut  (born October 9, 1992) is a Thai beauty pageant titleholder, who represented Thailand in Miss Earth 2013 and Miss International 2014. She placed as 2nd Runner-up for both pageants. Since 2021, she has been assigned as the manager and runway coach for Miss Universe Thailand pageant.

Early life
According to her interview published in the Miss Earth website, Kulsoontornrut grew up in near poverty with her big family. Although her family was poor, she was grateful for being taken care of, and for her, that is the lesson she values the most.

Pageantry

Miss Universe Thailand 2013
Kulsoontornrut joined the Miss Universe Thailand 2013 pageant held at Royal Paragon Hall, Siam Paragon and did not place. The pageant was won by Chalita Yaemwannang.

Miss Earth Thailand 2013
In November 2013, she joined the first edition of Miss Earth Thailand pageant, which was held on November 15, 2013 at Millennium Bangkok Hilton Hotel. Kulsoontornrut won the said pageant that earned her the right to represent Thailand in Miss Earth 2013. Punika was crowned by Watsaporn Wattanakoon, Miss Earth Thailand 2010.

Miss Earth 2013
Even though she had a very limited time to prepare for the pageant, she still performed very well in the 13th edition of Miss Earth. She received numerous special awards during the preliminaries. She got two gold medals for the "Most Child Friendly" award for group 3 and "Best in Resorts Wear" award. For the "National Costume" award, she got a bronze medal for team Asia. She also got a minor awards which were the "Miss Ever Bilena", "Gandang Ricky Reyes Award" and "Miss EB Advance" awards from the sponsors. She also became one of the Top 15 semifinalist in the Talent Competition segment. These made her one of the fan favorites by the fans for the crown.

As the pageant concluded, she became the Miss Earth-Water 2013. She was crowned by Miss Earth-Water 2011, Athena Imperial of the Philippines. Winning the 2nd Runner-up, she was one of two Asian candidate to be the Top 4 (along with Korean candidate Catharina Choi Nunes). At the end of the pageant, Alyz Henrich of Venezuela was declared as the winner. As of 2020, Miss Earth-Water is currently the highest placement for Thailand, and Punika shares the distinction with Watsaporn Wattanakoon, who won Miss Earth-Water 2010.

Dethronement
Effectively on October 13, 2014, she was dethroned by the Carousel Production due to violating her contract as a Miss Earth-Water 2013 titleholder. Her dethronement was on the ground of her joining another rival pageant which was Miss International, during her one-year reign as Miss Earth Water 2013.

Miss International 2014
Kulsoontornrut represented Thailand at Miss International 2014, which was held on November 11, 2014 at the Grand Prince Hotel Takanawa, Tokyo, Japan where she placed as the 2nd Runner-up.

Miss Universe Thailand 2020
She participated in Miss Universe Thailand 2020. Although being considered as a heavy favorite by many pageant portal, she finished as the 2nd Runner-up during the final competition on October 10, 2020.

Media and environmental activism
According to the Miss Earth website, her environmental advocacy is to "Believe in Yourself". For that, she believes that everything can be done for mother earth to protect it. She also guested, together with Miss Earth 2013 Alyz Henrich and the other elemental queens, in a local cable news channel, ABS-CBN News Channel, where they were asked about the pageant and their respective advocacies.

After the competition, Kulsoontornrut went to Myanmar to attend a fashion show where she had the chance to show her modelling skills.

As part of her win as Miss Earth-Water, she went to Réunion to attend the finals of Miss Earth Réunion Island 2014 where she became one of the judges. She also crowned the winner, Lolita Hoarau, with the Miss Earth Réunion Island 2013, Christelle Abrantes. She also did some environmental activities while on her trip in the country.

After her commitment in Réunion, Kulsoontornrut went to Mauritius to take part in the screenings for Miss Earth Mauritius 2014.

Filmography

Sitcom

References

External links
Punika Kulsoontornrut in Miss Earth Official Website

Living people
Punika Kulsoontornrut
Punika Kulsoontornrut
Miss Earth 2013 contestants
Miss International 2014 delegates
1992 births
Punika Kulsoontornrut
Miss Earth Thailand